The 2007 Nigerian Senate election in Plateau State was held on 21 April 2007, to elect members of the Nigerian Senate to represent Plateau State. Satty Davies Gogwim representing Plateau Central, John Nanzip Shagaya representing Plateau South and Gyang Dalyop Datong representing Plateau North all won on the platform of the People's Democratic Party.

Overview

Summary

Results

Plateau Central 
The election was won by Satty Davies Gogwim of the Peoples Democratic Party (Nigeria).

Plateau South 
The election was won by John Nanzip Shagaya of the Peoples Democratic Party (Nigeria).

Plateau North
The election was won by Gyang Dalyop Datong of the Peoples Democratic Party (Nigeria).

References 

April 2007 events in Nigeria
Plateau State Senate elections
Pla